Chiloglottis trilabra, commonly known as the long-clubbed wasp orchid, is a species of orchid endemic to south-eastern Australia. It has two dark green leaves and a single greenish brown or pinkish flower with a dark red to black, ant-like callus covering most of the upper surface of the labellum. It is similar to both C. seminuda and C. reflexa.

Description
The column has narrow wings. Flowering occurs from December to March.

This wasp orchid is similar to C. seminuda which has a callus covering only about two-thirds of the labellum. It is also similar to C. reflexa but has longer lateral sepals and a smaller "head" on the ant-like callus.

Taxonomy and naming
Chiloglottis trilabra was first formally described in 1883 by Robert D. FitzGerald and the description was published in Journal of Botany, British and Foreign from a specimen "obtained on Mount York in the Blue Mountains". The specific epithet (trilabra) is derived from the Latin prefix tri- meaning "three" and labra meaning "lip". The type specimen happened to be an aberrant form having two extra labellums in place of two lateral sepals.

Distribution and habitat
The long-clubbed wasp orchid is widespread in moist parts of forest, mainly on the ranges in New South Wales. In Victoria it is only known from a few areas in the east, but may be more widespread because it has been confused with C. seminuda and C. reflexa.

References

External links 

trilabra
Orchids of New South Wales
Orchids of Victoria (Australia)
Plants described in 1883